Glénay is a commune in the Deux-Sèvres department in the Nouvelle-Aquitaine region in western France. Its inhabitants are called Glénéens. The town is part of the Communité de Communes du Thouarsais. Located in the northern department between the Bressuirais Bocage and the Poitou Gâtine, it is watered by the Thouaret in a hilly landscape. It has a historic heritage, such as the castle and the church, both ranked.

See also
Communes of the Deux-Sèvres department

References

Communes of Deux-Sèvres